Alex Maskey (born 8 January 1952) is an Irish politician who has been Speaker of the Northern Ireland Assembly since 2020 and was the first member of Sinn Féin to serve as Lord Mayor of Belfast from 2002 to 2003. He was Sinn Féin's longest sitting councillor, representing the Laganbank electoral area of Belfast.
He was also an MLA for Belfast West for two periods, and also for Belfast South.

Early life
Maskey was educated at St Malachy's College and at the Belfast Institute for Further and Higher Education and then worked in Belfast docks as a labourer and barman. He was a successful amateur boxer, having only lost 4 out of 75 fights.

After the Troubles began in the late 1960s he became involved with the Provisional Irish Republican Army, and was interned twice in the 1970s.

Political career
Maskey stood unsuccessfully in West Belfast in the 1982 Assembly Election. In June 1983, Maskey won a by-election and became the first member of Sinn Féin to be elected to Belfast City Council since the 1920s. He was greeted with boos and jeers when he entered the chamber for his first council meeting, and unionist councillors started stamping their feet and screaming when he attempted to deliver his maiden speech in Irish.

Maskey emerged as a key ally of Sinn Féin President Gerry Adams' approach to the strategy. In 1987 he survived being shot at close range by loyalist paramilitaries. He was targeted again by loyalists in 1988, and also a gun attack at his home in 1993 when one of his friends, Alan Lundy, was killed. In 1996 Maskey was elected to the Northern Ireland Peace Forum for the Belfast West constituency but did not attend the Forum in accordance with Sinn Féin's policy of abstentionism. Two years later he was elected to the Northern Ireland Assembly, which on this occasion Sinn Féin did not boycott.

Maskey's growing political profile led him to contest the Belfast South constituency in the 2001 general election as part of Sinn Féin's strategy of building up their vote in one of their weaker constituencies.

In the local elections held on the same day he switched to the Laganbank area of South Belfast and won a seat there.

In 2002 Maskey became the first ever republican to serve as Lord Mayor of Belfast. His first duty in office was to open the annual Presbyterian General Assembly despite being a non-Presbyterian.

Maskey garnered general praise when as part of his duties as Lord Mayor in July 2002 he laid a wreath in memorial of British soldiers who died in the First World War. However he declined to attend the main memorial ceremony, stating that it was "the military commemoration of the Battle of the Somme". In his office he flew the British Union Jack and the Irish tricolour side by side.

In the 2003 Assembly election Maskey stood in South Belfast again and won Sinn Féin's first seat there with a boost in the vote share. He contested the same-named House of Commons seat in the 2005 general election with the vote share down on the Assembly elections, losing to the Social Democratic and Labour Party candidate, Alasdair McDonnell.

In March 2006, Maskey participated in the negotiations resulting in the Basque nationalist organisation ETA truce announced on 22 March. On 23 April 2007, he was announced as one of three Sinn Féin members who would sit on the re-vamped Northern Ireland Policing Board.

Maskey resigned from Belfast City Council in October 2010, as part of Sinn Féin's policy of abolishing double jobbing.

With the restoration of the Northern Ireland Assembly at Stormont, Maskey was elected Speaker on 11 January 2020.

On 23 September 2021, he announced that he would not seek re-election at the 2022 Assembly election. In a letter to Sinn Féin parties, he said it had been an "honour" to represent communities, adding "There is a lot of work left to do before the next assembly election and that is where my focus will be until then." In response, party leader and Deputy First Minister Michelle O'Neill said Maskey had been "a ferocious champion of the rights of communities within the Assembly, in Belfast City Council and on the ground". She added that he "was imprisoned without trial, faced down sustained threats and attacks by British state forces and their loyalist surrogates and was almost killed in an attack at his home which left him with permanent injuries."

Personal life
Maskey and his wife, Liz McKee have been married since 1981. They have two sons, Niall and Sean, and a granddaughter, Tierna.

On 25 December 2005, Maskey suffered a heart attack while with his family. Several weeks later he appeared on BBC Radio Ulster to talk about his health.

References

External links
 Profile on Sinn Féin website

1952 births
Irish republicans
Living people
Lord Mayors of Belfast
Members of Belfast City Council
Members of the Northern Ireland Forum
Northern Ireland MLAs 1998–2003
Northern Ireland MLAs 2003–2007
Northern Ireland MLAs 2007–2011
Northern Ireland MLAs 2011–2016
Northern Ireland MLAs 2016–2017
Northern Ireland MLAs 2017–2022
People educated at St Malachy's College
Provisional Irish Republican Army members
Republicans imprisoned during the Northern Ireland conflict
Sinn Féin MLAs
Sinn Féin councillors in Northern Ireland
Sinn Féin parliamentary candidates